Kenneth Meechan  (born 16 February 1972) is a Scottish footballer who played for Dumbarton and Stranraer.

He is currently one of three U17s coaches at his hometown club Greenock Morton.

References

1972 births
Living people
Scottish footballers
Dumbarton F.C. players
Stranraer F.C. players
Scottish Football League players
Footballers from Greenock
Greenock Morton F.C. non-playing staff
Association football goalkeepers